Myno Burney (1907–1996) was a Swiss film actress.

Partial filmography

 The Callbox Mystery (1932) - Paul Grayle
 The New Hotel (1932)
 Le petit écart (1932)
 La dame de chez Maxim's (1933)
 Le client du numéro 16 (1933)
 La cinquième empreinte (1934) - Suzanne
 Cessez le feu (1934)
 La famille Pont-Biquet (1935)
 La fille de Madame Angot (1935)
 Un soir de bombe (1935) - La femme de chambre
 Light Cavalry (1935) - Catella
 Prête-moi ta femme (1936) - Lily
 Bach the Detective (1936) - Vendeuse de la bijouterie
 Compliments of Mister Flow (1936) - (uncredited)
 Tout va très bien madame la marquise (1936)
 J'arrose mes galons (1936)
 La loupiote (1937) - La môme Torchon
 La belle de Montparnasse (1937) - Rosalie
 Passeurs d'hommes (1937) - Greta Worms
 Titin des Martigues (1938) - L'Américaine #1
 Trois artilleurs en vadrouille (1938) - La prof
 Les gaietés de l'exposition (1938) - Dolorès
 Les rois de la flotte (1938)
 Champions de France (1938) - Gladys Lodje
 Deux de la réserve (1938) - L'espionne
 Paradise Lost (1940) - (uncredited)
 The Lost Woman (1942) - Adrienne
 Le carrefour des enfants perdus (1944) - Germaine (uncredited)
 The Temptation of Barbizon (1946) - Dominique Ancelin
 Good Lord Without Confession (1953) - Marie Dupont
 La Traversée de Paris (1956) - Angèle Marchandot (final film role)

References

Bibliography
 Goble, Alan. The Complete Index to Literary Sources in Film. Walter de Gruyter, 1999.

External links

1907 births
1996 deaths
Swiss film actresses
Actors from Geneva